The Gonja language, properly called Ngbanya or Ngbanyito, is a North Guang language spoken by an estimated 230,000 people, almost all of whom are of the Gonja ethnic group of northern Ghana.  Related to Guang languages in the south of Ghana, it is spoken by about a third of the population in the northern region. The Brong-Ahafo and Volta regions lie to the south of the Gonja-speaking area, while Dagombas, Mamprussis and Walas are to the north. Its dialects are Gonja and Choruba.

Alphabet

Vowels used are: a,e,i,o,ɔ,u,ɛ. Consonants include: ch , ŋm, ny, gb, kp, sh .

Pronouns
Personal pronouns as subject of the sentence:

Names

References

Colin Painter, Gonja: a phonological and grammatical study, Indiana University, 1970

External links
ComparaLex, database with Gonja word list

Guang languages
Languages of Ghana